Drona Prasad Acharya was a Nepalese politician, writer and journalist from Bhadrapur. He was elected to the parliament in the 1991 election as a Communist Party of Nepal (Unified Marxist-Leninist) candidate in the Jhapa-1 constituency with 13721 votes (34.22%).

References

Marxist journalists
Communist Party of Nepal (Unified Marxist–Leninist) politicians
Living people
Year of birth missing (living people)
Nepal MPs 1991–1994
Members of the Rastriya Panchayat
Khas people